Qazi Mahalleh (also Romanized as Qāẕī Maḩalleh) is a village in Machian Rural District, Kelachay District, Rudsar County, Gilan Province, Iran. At the 2006 census, its population was 331, in 104 families.

References 

Populated places in Rudsar County